Miss Earth Malaysia 2017,the 7th Miss Earth Malaysia pageant will be held at Syeun Hotel, Ipoh, in Perak on July 30, 2017.

Placements

Contestants
19 contestants from 7 states has been confirmed.

References

Miss Earth by country